An umpire is an official in the sport of Australian rules football who adjudicates the game according to the "Laws Of The Game", the official handbook of Australian Rules Football. Umpiring the game of AFL across all leagues be it professional or juniors just starting have been subject to long history of abuse, in 2022 the AFL a long all the other associations have stepped up to help stamp out that  abuse.

Origins

Unlike many other codes of football, where the official is called a referee, in Australian rules football the officials are called umpires. Tom Wills, one of the founders of the Australian game, was the earliest known umpire of a football match in Australia.

At first the captains of both teams shared the duty of officiating games, but as the game became more professional in the 1880s, umpires became an important aspect of the game.

Abuse

Banter and questioning the umpires decisions at events have been around the sport since the sport began. That questioning has at times has commonly become extreme to the point where umpires have declined to umpire at various grounds.

In 1920 the VFL requested that police escort umpires off the field after games.
Comments in the press about abuse of umpires and their competency has arisen in a range of locations and eras.

Types

There are four different types of umpires and one type of steward in a typical game of Australian Football:

 Field umpire - the field umpire (also known as a central umpire) is responsible controlling general play, and is positioned within the field of play. The field umpire is the only type of umpire permitted to award free kicks or initiate stoppages in play, and he executes ball-ups to restart play.

Originally, only one field umpire controlled each game. In the VFL/AFL, this was increased to two in 1976, then to three in 1994, and then to four in 2023. Amateur, suburban, junior and semi-professional matches can be policed by any number from one to three field umpires.

 Goal umpire - Goal umpires are responsible for all adjudications relating to the goal-line, to determine whether or not a ball has scored a goal, behind, or failed to cross the goal-line. Goal umpires also serve as the official score-keepers for the match. A goal umpire signals a score at his end of the ground by raising their index fingers in front of them at waist height, using one for a behind and two for a goal; then, the goal umpires at both ends wave flags to each to confirm and record the score. After each quarter, the umpires check their scores, and confirm that the ground scoreboard matches the official score.

There are generally two goal umpires in each game at all levels, one at each end of the ground; occasionally, the use of two goal umpires at each end of the ground has been trialled. Goal umpires traditionally wore a white jacket, black trousers and a broad-brimmed hat, however caps and shirts have replaced the hats and jackets. The caps they wear are generally lime green or grey. They are the only umpires to wear a cap.

 Boundary umpire - the boundary umpire is responsible for determining when the ball has left the field of play, and whether it has done so on the bounce or on the full. The boundary umpire is responsible for throwing the ball back into play when it has left the field of play (a throw-in), and he assists the goal umpire when there is a set shot for goal by standing and observing from the behind post.

In the professional level Australian Football League, there are four boundary umpires in each match with two umpires sharing control of each side of the ground. At lower levels, there are typically only two or three boundary umpires.

 Emergency umpire - particularly in professional matches, an emergency umpire may be provided specifically to be used as a replacement if an umpire is injured. The emergency umpire can also monitor the play from the bench for behind-the-play incidents, and can enter the field if required to break up scuffles and fights between players and enforce the blood rule.  Like field umpires, they have the ability to report (or in lower levels eject) players. Oversees other officials, such as club runners, and interchanging of players.
 Interchange stewards - although they are not officially an umpire, there are two of these at a match. They oversee the interchanging of players, and make sure no more than 18 players per team are on the field at any one time. Where league rules permit, stewards can report to the emergency umpire to allow free kicks to be paid for interchange infringements.

Provision of umpires
At the professional level, and at other high levels of the game, all umpires and officials are provided by the league's umpiring department. At lower levels, it is common for the competing clubs to each provide one goal umpire and one boundary umpire to the match, but field umpires are still almost always provided by the league.

Modern umpiring and the AFL
The game of Australian rules contains some "grey areas" where application of the laws is subject to interpretation, of degree or timing, making the job of field umpires extremely difficult.  The instigation of new laws by the AFL in recent years, also contributes to the amount of work needed for umpires to maintain their skills and knowledge of the game. The umpires' director for the AFL is Jeff Gieschen, responsible for setting precedents for other affiliated leagues around the world.

Attire

Australian rules football umpires of all disciplines traditionally wore all-white uniforms. Goal umpires in particular wore a more formal attire of white jacket, white hat, tie and black slacks, as they were not required to actively run.

More recently, umpires have begun wearing uniforms of a distinctive colour to avoid a jersey clash with any of the competing teams. As of 2013, all AFL umpires wore lime green uniforms with grey shorts or trousers, which avoids a clash with any of the league's teams. However with some jumpers featuring more yellow, and in games where there are jumpers like this, the AFL umpires wear blue Additionally, field umpires in the AFL are identifiable by a jersey number.

The most common historical pejorative term for an umpire, particularly a field umpire, was "white maggot", in reference to their historical white uniforms.

References

See also

 List of Australian rules football umpires

Australian rules football terminology
 
Sports officiating